The 2009 Winmau World Masters was the fourth major tournament on the BDO/WDF calendar for 2009. It took place from September 4–6 in the Bridlington Spa Royal Hall. It was shown on the BBC. The men's final was won by Martin Adams, who beat Robbie Green by 7 sets to 6. The women's final was won by Linda Ithurralde, who beat Trina Gulliver by 4 legs to 3.

Seeds
 

Men
  Tony O'Shea 
  Scott Waites 
  Darryl Fitton 
  Ted Hankey 
  Martin Adams
  Ross Montgomery
  Steve West 
  Joey ten Berge 

Women
  Trina Gulliver 
  Irina Armstrong 
  Julie Gore
  Tricia Wright 
  Francis Hoenselaar 
  Dee Bateman 
  Karin Krappen 
  Lisa Ashton

Men's Draw
From the Last 24

Scores after player's names are three-dart averages (total points scored divided by darts thrown and multiplied by 3)

Ladies Draw

References

World Masters (darts)
World Masters
Bridlington
2000s in the East Riding of Yorkshire